Pallacanestro Olimpia Milano, commonly known as Olimpia Milano or as EA7 Emporio Armani Milan after its title sponsor, is an LBA Italian professional basketball team, based in Milan, Italy. Its colors are white and red, and the team is sometimes referred as "Scarpette Rosse" (Little Red Shoes) because team officials imported red Converse All-Star shoes for players from the United States. The tag line stuck, and the nickname is still used by many fans today.

As per custom in the Italian league, sponsorship has kept the team name changing frequently. From 1930 until 1955, it was called Borletti Milano. From 1956 to 1973, it was renamed Simmenthal. Other famous sponsorship names were Billy, Simac, Tracer, and Philips, in the 1980s. For past club sponsorship names, see the list below.

Olimpia is the most successful basketball club in Italy and one of the most successful in Europe, having won 29 Italian League Championships, 8 Italian National Cups, 4 Italian Super Cups, 3 EuroLeague, 1 FIBA Intercontinental Cup, 3 FIBA Saporta Cups, 2 FIBA Korać Cups and many junior titles.

In 2016, the club was included in the Italian Basketball Hall of Fame.

History

The birth and the Borletti era (1930-1955)

The birth of Pallacanestro Olimpia Milano is traditionally dated 1936, year of the first Italian League Championship title. Actually it was founded 6 years earlier (in 1930) as "Dopolavoro Borletti" by Fratelli Borletti managers. Borletti team won 4 consecutive Italian League Championships from 1936 to 1939.

In 1947, Milan businessman Adolfo Bogoncelli merged Pallacanestro Como and Borletti to form a new society, commonly known as "Borolimpia". "Borletti" brand was the main sponsor of the team, becoming the first sponsor in the history of Italian sport.

In 1955, after 9 Italian League Championships, Borletti brand leaves Olimpia Milano jersey.

The Simmenthal era (1956-1973) 

The team regularly won the Italian League Championship in the 1950s and the 1960s, with players including Gabriele Vianello, Sandro Riminucci, Gianfranco Pieri, and Bill Bradley. In 1966, Olimpia won its first FIBA European Champions Cup.

In the 1970s, three teams were fighting across Europe for supremacy: Olimpia Milano, Ignis Varese, and Real Madrid. Pallacanestro Varese and Olimpia Milano were arch-rivals, as the two cities are 25 miles (40 km) apart. While Milano was a frequent Italian League champion, they were unable to win again the prestigious FIBA European Champions Cup. Late in the 1970s, the quality of the club declined, but Olimpia Milano still managed to win a FIBA Cup Winners' Cup.

In 1973, Simmenthal brand leaves Olimpia jersey after 17 years and 10 Italian League Championships.

1974–2007
In the 1970s through the 1980s, the team acquired several notable players, including the Boselli twins (Franco and Dino), Mike Sylvester, Chas Menatti, Dino Meneghin, Mike D'Antoni, John Gianelli, Roberto Premier. Bob McAdoo, Joe Barry Carroll, Russ Schoene, Antoine Carr, and Mike Brown. American head coach Dan Peterson led the team back to prominence.

In the 1980s, the team was sold to the Gabetti family. After this, they qualified for nine Serie A championships finals, winning five, with the 1987 team winning the Serie A title, the 1986–87 FIBA European Champions Cup (won also in 1988: both finals were won against Maccabi Tel Aviv), the Italian Cup and the 1987 FIBA Club World Cup. This gave the club the coveted "Triple Crown" and the even rarer "Quadruple Crown".

Led by point guard Sasha Djordjević, the team won another FIBA Korać Cup in 1993. Bepi Stefanel purchased the team franchise in 1994, and signed-up notable European players like Dejan Bodiroga, Gregor Fučka, Sandro De Pol, and Nando Gentile.  In 1996, the team won the Italian Cup and its 25th Italian National Championship, celebrating the 60th anniversary of the club.

Team management was inconsistent, as ownership groups from 1998 to 2004. Players of the team included Warren Kidd, Hugo Sconochini, Claudio Coldebella and Petar Naumoski. In 2005, owner Corbelli, which bought the club in 2002, from Sergio Tacchini, was flanked by Adriano Galliani (managing director of Italian Football club A.C. Milan), Massimo Moratti (President of rival club Internazionale), NBA star Kobe Bryant, and stylist Giorgio Armani, as sponsor with the Armani Jeans brand. After difficult years, led by coach Lino Lardo, Olimpia reached the national championship Finals, finally being beaten by Climamio Bologna.

On January 25, 2006, in the midst of a disappointing season in the EuroLeague and domestically, Djordjevic was named as the team's new coach. He left as coach after the 2006–07 season, but not before securing Olimpia a berth in the 2007–08 Euroleague.

2008–present
In 2008, Giorgio Armani bought the team from Giorgio Corbelli, standing as the only owner, entirely changing the management structure, naming Livio Proli as president, and Lucio Zanca as general manager. Piero Bucchi was chosen to coach the new team, leading Olimpia twice to second place in LEGA Basket, being defeated by Montepaschi Siena in both cases.

In January 2011, after 23 years, coach Dan Peterson came back from retirement to replace Piero Bucchi as head coach. However, his stint at Olimpia Milano this time was quite short: after failing to reach the championship Finals, on June 9, Olimpia Milano announced Sergio Scariolo as new head coach for the 2011–12 season. The first player signed for the 2011–12 season was Omar Cook, an American-born play maker, who had played the previous season with Power Electronics Valencia. Owing to the NBA lockout, Danilo Gallinari went back to his alma mater, playing 15 games (8 in the Italian League, 7 in EuroLeague): he left the team in December.
Sergio Scariolo was replaced by Luca Banchi at the beginning of the 2013–14 season, and the team brought from Montepaschi Siena: David Moss, Kristjan Kangur, and Daniel Hackett.

The team reached the quarterfinals of EuroLeague, 16 years after its last appearance, but the team lost against the eventual league champions, Maccabi Tel Aviv. The team finished in the 1st position the LEGA Basket regular season, and in the 7th game of the playoff's finals, Olimpia won its 26th Italian League championship title, its first after 18 years. Alessandro Gentile, the captain of Olimpia, was named MVP of the finals.

On June 29, 2017, Simone Pianigiani was hired as the new head coach and on June 15, 2018, Milano went to win his 28th title by beating Dolomiti Energia Trento in game 6 of the 2018 LBA Finals.

On June 11, 2019, legend Ettore Messina signed a deal as the new head coach of the club and president of all basketball operations for the following three seasons.

On May 4, 2021, the club reached the Euroleague Final Four after 29 years (1992 Final Four).

Logos

Arenas

Secondary Arenas

Olimpia Milano used the OND Borletti outdoor court of Via Costanza for almost 20 years. In the mid-1940s, they moved to the Palazzo dello Sport della Fiera, which had a seating capacity of 18,000 people, and was then the largest indoor sports arena in Europe, and second only to the Madison Square Garden in New York City. In 1960, the Palazzo dello Sport della Fiera was abandoned, and Olimpia moved into the original structure of the PalaLido, which then had a smaller seating capacity of 3,500, but because of lack of security measures at the time, often was filled with up to 10,000 people.

At the end of the 1970s, Olimpia moved into the newly built Palasport di San Siro, a multi-purpose facility built next to the Meazza Stadium, that was able to hold about 15,000 spectators. In 1985, the roof of the Palasport di San Siro collapsed and Olimpia returned to PalaLido for a season, waiting for the construction of a provisional arena. In 1986, they moved into the recently built 10,045 seat PalaTrussardi, where they played through the early 1990s.

The club then moved into its current home arena, the Mediolanum Forum, which has a seating capacity of 12,700. The club has also played some home games at the 6,700 seat PalaDesio. Recently, the club considered moving back to the newly rebuilt and modernized PalaLido (named Allianz Cloud), after it was remodeled, and had its seating capacity expanded. However, the club ultimately decided to continue using the Mediolanum Forum as its home arena, due to its much larger seating capacity, as compared to the new Allianz Cloud. However, the new arena is used when Mediolanum Forum is unavailable.

Honours

Domestic competitions
 Italian League
 Winners (29): 1935–36, 1936–37, 1937–38, 1938–39, 1949–50, 1950–51, 1951–52, 1952–53, 1953–54, 1956–57, 1957–58, 1958–59, 1959–60, 1961–62, 1962–63, 1964–65, 1965–66, 1966–67, 1971–72, 1981–82, 1984–85, 1985–86, 1986–87, 1988–89, 1995–96, 2013–14, 2015–16, 2017–18, 2021–22
 Runners-up (18): 1934, 1940–41, 1955–56, 1963–64, 1968–69, 1969–70, 1970–71, 1972–73, 1973–74, 1978–79, 1982–83, 1983–84, 1987–88, 1990–91, 2004–05, 2008–09, 2009–10, 2011–12
 Italian Cup
 Winners (8): 1971–72, 1985–86, 1986–87, 1995–96, 2015–16, 2016–17, 2020–21, 2021–22 
 Runners-up (2): 1969–70, 2014–15
 Italian Supercup
 Winners (4): 2016, 2017, 2018, 2020
 Runners-up (3): 1996, 2014, 2015, 2021

European competitions
 EuroLeague
 Winners (3): 1965–66, 1986–87, 1987–88
 Runners-up (2): 1966–67, 1982–83
 Semifinalists (3): 1963–64, 1967–68, 1972–73, 1985–86
 3rd place (2): 1991–92, 2020–21
 Final Four (5): 1966, 1967, 1988, 1992, 2021
 FIBA Saporta Cup (defunct)
 Winners (3): 1970–71, 1971–72, 1975–76
 Runners-up (2): 1983–84, 1997–98
 Semifinalists (1): 1976–77
 FIBA Korać Cup (defunct)
 Winners (2): 1984–85, 1992–93
 Runners-up (2): 1994–95, 1995–96
 Semifinalists (3): 1977–78, 1988–89, 1993–94
 European Basketball Club Super Cup (semi-official, defunct)
 3rd place (2): 1985, 1989
 4th place (2): 1986, 1987
 Latin Cup (defunct)
 Winners (1): 1966
 Runners-up (1): 1953

Worldwide competitions
 FIBA Intercontinental Cup
 Winners (1): 1987
 3rd place (2): 1967, 1968
 McDonald's Championship (defunct)
 3rd place (2): 1987, 1989

Unofficial
 Triple Crown
 Winners (1): 1986–87
Small Triple Crown
 Winners (1): 1971–72

Other Competitions
 Castellanza, Italy Invitational Game
 Winners (1): 2007
 Memoriale di Tulio Rochlitzer
 Winners (1): 2007
 Torneo Caorle
 Winners (2): 2007, 2011
 Reggio Emilia, Italy Invitational Game
 Winners (1): 2008
 Torneo Lombardia
 Winners (2): 2009, 2016
 Torneo Castelleto Ticino
 Winners (3): 2009, 2018, 2019
 Verona, Italy Invitational Game
 Winners (1): 2011
 Trofeo de Ejea de los Caballeros
 Winners (1): 2011
 Belgrade, Serbia Invitational Game
 Winners (1): 2014
 Torneo del Circuito della Valtellina
 Winners (1): 2014
 Trofeo Memorial Gianni Brusinelli
 Winners (1): 2016
 Torneo Lovari
 Winners (1): 2017
 Torneo Lucca 
 Winners (1): 2019
 Milan, Italy Invitational Game
 Winners (1): 2019

Players

Current roster

Depth chart

Retired numbers

Season by season

Top performances in European & Worldwide competitions

Matches against NBA teams

Sponsorship names

Through the years, due to sponsorship deals, it has been also known as:
Borletti (1930–1955)
Simmenthal (1955–1973)
Innocenti (1973–1975)
Cinzano (1975–1978)
Billy (1978–1983)
Simac (1983–1986)
Tracer (1986–1988)
Philips (1988–1993)
Recoaro (1993–94)
Stefanel (1994–1998)
Sony (1998–99)
Adecco (1999–2002)
Pippo (2002–03)
Breil (2003–04)
Armani Jeans (2004–2011)
EA7 Emporio Armani (2011–2018)
AX Armani Exchange (2018–present)

Notable players

  #9 Cesare Rubini (1948–1957)
  #7 Sergio Stefanini (1949–1955)
  #5 Enrico Pagani (1949–1960)
  #3 Romeo Romanutti (1950–1958)
  #8 Sandro Gamba (1950–1963)
  #7 Gianfranco Pieri (1955–1968)
  #10 Sandro Riminucci (1956–1970)
  #9 Paolo Vittori (1959–1965)
  #6 Gabriele Vianello (1962–1967)
  #8 Massimo Masini (1963–1974)
  #5 Giulio Iellini (1964–1975)
  #9 Skip Thoren (1965–1966)
  #15 Bill Bradley (1965–1966)
  #18, #9 Vittorio Ferracini (1967–1969, 1973–1983)
  #6 Giuseppe Brumatti (1967–1977)
  #13 Renzo Bariviera (1969–1975)
  #18 (Ret) Art Kenney (1970–1973)
  Mike Sylvester (1975–1980)
  #12 Vittorio Gallinari (1976–1987)
   #8 (Ret) Mike D'Antoni (1977–1990)
  #11 (Ret) Dino Meneghin (1980–1990, 1993–1994)
  #10 Roberto Premier (1981–1989)
  #15 Joe Barry Carroll (1984–1985)
  #14 Russ Schoene (1984–1986)
  #7 Riccardo Pittis (1984–1993)
  #13 Ken Barlow (1986–1987)
  #15 Bob McAdoo (1986–1990)
  #13 Ricky Brown (1987–1988)
  #12 Antonello Riva (1989–1994)
  #15 Darryl Dawkins (1991–1992)
  Antonio Davis (1992–1993)
  #4, #19 Aleksandar Đorđević (1992–1994, 2005)
  Hugo Sconochini (1993–1995, 2002–2004)
  #10 Dejan Bodiroga (1994–1996)
   #7 Gregor Fučka (1994–1997)
  #5 Ferdinando Gentile (1994–1998)
  #15 Rolando Blackman (1995–1996)
  #9 Marco Mordente (1996–2000, 2008–2011)
  Giorgos Sigalas (1997–1998)
  #12 Melvin Booker (1998–1999, 2007–2008)
 Massimo Bulleri (2005–2008, 2008–2009, 2009–2010) 
  #8 Danilo Gallinari (2006–2008; 2011)
  Mindaugas Katelynas (2007–2009)
  #14, #34 David Hawkins (2008–2009, 2010–2011)
   #12 Richard Mason Rocca (2008–2012)
  #8 Jonas Mačiulis (2009–2011)
  Marijonas Petravičius (2009–2011)
  Stefano Mancinelli (2009–2012)
  #9, #18 Nicolò Melli (2010–2015)
  #15 Ioannis Bourousis (2011–2013)
  Malik Hairston (2011–2013)
  #25, #5 Alessandro Gentile (2011–2016)
  #23 Keith Langford (2012–2014)
  #55 Curtis Jerrells (2013–2014; 2017–2019)
  #24 Samardo Samuels (2013–2015)
  #13 Milan Mačvan (2015–2017)
  #43 Krunoslav Simon (2015–2017)
  #21 Rakim Sanders (2016–2017)
  Mantas Kalnietis (2016–2018)
  #0 Drew Goudelock (2017–2018)
  #9 Dairis Bertāns (2017–2019)
  #5 Vladimir Micov (2017–2021)
  #77 Artūras Gudaitis (2017–2020)
  #19 Mindaugas Kuzminskas (2018–2019)
  #00 Amedeo Della Valle (2018–2020)
  #32 Jeff Brooks (2018–2021)
  #13 Sergio Rodriguez (2019–2022)
  #42 Kyle Hines (2020–present)
  #70 Luigi Datome (2020–present)

Notes

References

External links
  
 2018-19 LBA team page 
 2018-19 Euroleague team page 

 
1936 establishments in Italy
Basketball teams established in 1936
Basketball teams in Lombardy
EuroLeague clubs
EuroLeague-winning clubs
Sport in Milan